The Palos Verdes Peninsula (Palos Verdes, Spanish for "Green Sticks") is a landform and a geographic sub-region of the Los Angeles metropolitan area, within southwestern Los Angeles County in the U.S. state of California. Located in the South Bay region, the peninsula contains a group of cities in the Palos Verdes Hills, including Palos Verdes Estates, Rancho Palos Verdes, Rolling Hills and Rolling Hills Estates, as well as the unincorporated community of Westfield/Academy Hill. The South Bay city of Torrance borders the peninsula on the north, the Pacific Ocean is on the west and south, and the Port of Los Angeles is east. As of the 2010 Census, the population of the Palos Verdes Peninsula is 65,008.

The hill cities on the peninsula are known for dramatic ocean and city views, distinguished schools, extensive horse trails, and high value homes.

History

Native Americans

The peninsula was the homeland of the Tongva-Gabrieliño Native Americans people for thousands of years. In other areas of the Los Angeles Basin archeological sites date back 8,000 years. Their first contact with Europeans occurred in 1542 with João Cabrilho (Juan Cabrillo). Chowigna and Suangna were two Tongva settlements of many in the peninsula area, which was also a departure point for their rancherías on the Channel Islands.

Spanish and Mexican era

In 1846, José Dolores Sepúlveda and José Loreto received a Mexican land grant from Alta California Governor Pío Pico for a parcel from the huge original 1784 Spanish land grant of Rancho San Pedro to Manuel Dominguez. It was named Rancho de los Palos Verdes, or "ranch of the green sticks", which was used primarily as a cattle ranch. It was also briefly used as a whaling station in the mid-19th century.

American era
By 1882, ownership of the land had passed from the Sepulveda family through various mortgage holders to Jotham Bixby of Rancho Los Cerritos, who leased the land to Japanese farmers.

Frank Vanderlip, representing a group of wealthy east coast investors, purchased 25 square miles of land on the Palos Verdes Peninsula in 1913 for $1.5 million. In 1914, Vanderlip vacationed at Palos Verdes in order to recover from an illness, and he was astounded by scenery he compared to "the Sorrentine Peninsula and the Amalfi Drive." He quickly initiated development of Palos Verdes. He hired the Olmsted Brothers, the landscaping firm of John Charles Olmsted and Frederick Law Olmsted Jr., to plan and landscape a new subdivision. The Olmsted Brothers contracted Koebig & Koebig to perform engineering work, including surveying and road planning. However, the project stalled as World War I started, and Vanderlip accepted a chairmanship to the War Savings Committee in Washington, D.C. in 1916.

By 1921, Vanderlip had lost interest in overseeing development of Palos Verdes and enticed Edward Gardner Lewis to take over the project with an option to buy the property for $5 million. Lewis was an experienced developer, but lacked the capital to purchase and develop Palos Verdes. Instead, he established a real estate trust, capitalizing the project through the sale of notes which were convertible to Palos Verdes property.  Under the terms of the trust, Lewis sought to raise $30 million for infrastructure improvements, effectively borrowing from investors for both the land and the improvements. He succeeded in attracting $15 million in capital, but far short of the $35 million needed. The trust dissolved and ownership of Palos Verdes reverted to Vanderlip.

Vanderlip established a new real estate trust to purchase 3,200 acres from his land syndicate and establish the subdivision of Palos Verdes Estates. The new trust assumed not just the land, but also the improvements made by Lewis. They were not complete, but they were substantial: improvements included many sewers, water mains, and roads; landscaping, parks, and a golf course. They opened Palos Verdes for public inspection in June 1923.

Palos Verdes Estates was organized and landscaped by the Olmsted Brothers and in their planning, they dedicated a quarter of the land area to permanent open undeveloped space.

Commerce

Areas of commerce include historic Mediterranean Revival style Malaga Cove Plaza and the Promenade on the Peninsula. Smaller shopping centers include the Peninsula Center, Lunada Bay Plaza, and Golden Cove Plaza.

The largest peninsula commercial district is in Rolling Hills Estates, with many shopping centers including The Promenade on the Peninsula with a megaplex movie theater and an ice rink.

The Palos Verdes area has ocean views, coastline views and city light views.

The Peninsula is home to the Promenade on the Peninsula mall, originally an enclosed regional mall with two department store anchors, May Company California and Bullocks Wilshire, as well as the Peninsula Center, which originally had a Buffums department store.

Transportation

The Palos Verdes Peninsula Transit Authority provides bus service within and to the Palos Verdes Peninsula. The Palos Verdes Peninsula is within 40 minutes of both LAX and Long Beach Airport, which together provide access to most of the United States aboard all major carriers.

Education

The Palos Verdes Peninsula Unified School District has one of the highest rated API scores in California and has one of the highest average SAT scores and one of the highest percentage of students successfully completing the Advanced Placement exams in the county. There are three high schools, Palos Verdes Peninsula High School (formerly called Rolling Hills High School), Palos Verdes High School, and Rancho Del Mar High School (located in Rolling Hills). The former Marymount California University, a co-ed Roman Catholic four-year college was located in Rancho Palos Verdes. A private K–12 school, Chadwick School, is also located there. Rolling Hills Country Day School, adjacent to the Botanic Garden, offers a private K-8 education. In total, there are 11 elementary schools, 3 intermediate schools, and 3 high schools located on the peninsula.

In the Eastview neighborhood of Rancho Palos Verdes, however, residents have the option to choose either PV schools or the surrounding LAUSD schools (i.e. Dodson Middle School, Dana Middle School, San Pedro High School, etc.).

Additionally, students are also able to attend the California Academy of Mathematics and Science in Carson due to its attendance boundaries stretching to the South Bay, which is about 20-40 minutes from the peninsula itself.

Libraries
The Peninsula is served by the Palos Verdes Library District, which operates these three libraries:
 Peninsula Center Library
 Miraleste Library
 Malaga Cove Library- on the National Historical Register

The 40 Families Project based at Peninsula Center Library documents the history of the Japanese-American community on Palos Verdes before World War II.

Parks and recreation

 South Coast Botanic Garden – 35 hectare (87 acre) landscaped botanical garden, event venue, and arboretum with over 150,000 landscape plants and trees from approximately 140 families, 700 genera, and 2,000 different species. It is a classic example of land recycling by reclaiming a site that was previously a sanitary landfill and open pit diatomite mine from 1929 until 1956.
 Point Vicente Park is a popular spot for watching the migration of gray whales to and from their breeding lagoon in Baja California.
 Fort MacArthur Military Museum is located near Point Fermin in San Pedro.
 Del Cerro Park is a popular spot to hike trail at end of Crenshaw Blvd.
 Ryan Park is Rancho Palos Verdes's first established park in the city, overlooking a view of nearby island Santa Catalina. Park features include baseball diamond, picnic areas with barbecue, and a community room.

The peninsula is frequented by runners, hikers, horseback riders, bird watchers, surfers, scuba divers, fishermen, and bicyclists. The area is home to several golf courses and country clubs. In addition, nude sunbathers formerly frequented Sacreds Cove (or "Smugglers Cove") until the city of Rancho Palos Verdes enacted a 1994 ordinance that ended such use of that beach.

The infamous Palos Verdes surf spots have been in the spotlight many times over issues of localism. The most notorious surf spot for localism in Palos Verdes is Lunada Bay, which can hold any winter swell and has been known to rival Sunset Beach, Hawaii on a big day. Localism in Palos Verdes reached a turning point in 2001 when a civil rights lawsuit was filed after a particularly violent confrontation with Hermosa Beach surfers. Surveillance cameras were placed in the surfing area but were later removed. In 2016, The Coastal Commission targeted the group after "renewed reports that their unpermitted structure [built along Lunada Bay] was being used as a spot for ongoing bullying and intimidation." On July 12, 2016, City Manager Tony Dahlerbruch recommended the removal of the illegal structure after pressure from the California Coastal Commission.

The Trump National Golf Club is a Donald Trump venture with a golf course on the Ocean Trails cliffs. The 18th hole of the prior golf course fell victim to a landslide caused by a leak in the sanitary pipes underneath it. In the summer of 2006, the golf club erected a 70-foot flagpole for an American flag; critics claimed it was illegal, but the golf club was allowed to retain it after a City Council vote.

The Marineland of the Pacific site near Portuguese Bend is currently home of Terranea, a luxury oceanfront resort.

There are numerous nature reserves in Palos Verdes: Palos Verdes Estates Shoreline Preserve, Agua Amarga Reserve, and Portuguese Bend Reserve. The reserves contain coastal sage scrubs habitats, a community of fragrant and drought resistant shrubs and flowering plants. In August 2009, wildfire burned approximately 165-acres of the Portuguese Bend Reserve. As a result, restoration has been done to reinstall native plants and animals to the area.

Flora and fauna

Native plants 
 Succulents
 Trees
 Shrubs
 Vines
 Herbaceous plants
 Marah (plant)

Native animals 
 Palos Verdes blue butterfly
 opossum
 gray fox
 coyote
 black phoebe
 water strider
  western fence lizard
 red tailed hawk
 honey bee
 cottontail rabbit

Notable places

 The Wayfarers Chapel, a transparent glass chapel in a redwood forest, was designed in 1951 by the renowned architect and landscape architect Lloyd Wright. It is under the stewardship of the Swedenborgian Church, a well-known landmark on the National Register of Historic Places, and overlooking the ocean at the western entrance of Portuguese Bend.
 Portuguese Bend is one of the most geologically unstable areas in the world. Constant shifting of the soil (approximately 1/3 of an inch a day) and rock slides mean that Palos Verdes Drive South, the main road through the bend, is under constant repair.
 Point Vicente Lighthouse is on the National Register of Historic Places.
 Korean Bell of Friendship is located near Point Fermin in San Pedro.
 Marineland of the Pacific is the location of the former aquatic theme park on the coast. 
 MTV Beach House. Fox filmed some scenes of its teen drama, The OC, at locations in and around Palos Verdes.

Wrecks
 The wreck of the SS Dominator, a freighter that ran aground in 1961, was for years an attraction for those willing to hike down the cliffs to the shoreline. Very little is left of the ship today.
 In 2006, the 45-foot cabin cruiser Lady Hawk sank two miles from the Palos Verdes coast due to an engine fire.

Notable people

Sports
 Tracy Austin, former World No. 1 female professional tennis player
 Heather Burge, pro basketball player
 Heidi Burge, pro basketball player
 John Cook, pro golfer, graduated from Miraleste High School
 Lindsay Davenport, former World No. 1 female professional tennis player
 Taylor Fritz, professional tennis player
 Michelle Kwan, 5-time world champion figure skater, attended Soleado elementary school
 Seattle Seahawks head coach Pete Carroll, lived in city
 Los Angeles Lakers head coach Luke Walton, lived in city
 Former pro basketball player Elden Campbell of the Los Angeles Lakers, currently resides in Palos Verdes Estates
 Bill Laimbeer, Notre Dame and NBA basketball star, WNBA coach, attended Palos Verdes High School
 Jeremy Lin, pro basketball player of the Los Angeles Lakers, lives in city
 Billy Martin, pro tennis player, UCLA coach, attended Palos Verdes High School
 Joe Montana, Hall of Fame NFL quarterback of San Francisco 49ers lived in Palos Verdes Estates during off-season
 John Morrison, professional wrestler 
 Christen Press, forward of the United States women's national soccer team
 Pete Sampras, former World No. 1 male professional tennis player
 Anderson Silva, UFC Middleweight Champion, lives in city
 Eliot Teltscher, professional tennis player

Entertainment
 Chester Bennington, lead singer of Linkin Park
 Christina Crawford, actress and author of Mommie Dearest, adoptive daughter of Joan Crawford, attended Chadwick School
 Best-selling author and neuroscientist Daniel Levitin
 Musician HYDE, lead singer of Japanese rock band L'Arc~En~Ciel owns property in the region
 Juan Croucier, bass player and songwriter of the bands Ratt and Dokken
 Actor Michael Dudikoff
 Actress Liza Minnelli, attended Chadwick School, a private K–12 school located on the Peninsula
 Author, actor and filmmaker Scott Shaw
 Model and actress Coco Austin, wife of actor-rapper Ice-T

Other
 Christopher Boyce and Andrew Daulton Lee, who sold U.S. secrets to the Soviets, portrayed in book and movie The Falcon and the Snowman
 Galorath Inc. CEO and President Dan Galorath
 Natalie Pack, 2012 Miss California USA, contestant America's Next Top Model, Cycle 12
 Frank A. Vanderlip, known as the Father of Palos Verdes

See also

 Horse community
 Palos Verdes blue—an endangered species of endemic butterfly of the Palos Verdes Peninsula
 Palos Verdes Peninsula Land Conservancy
 Peninsula—including a list of peninsulas
 Transverse Ranges—with the Palos Verdes Hills and Channel Islands a single geologic range.

Climate
According to the Köppen Climate Classification system, Palos Verdes has a Mediterranean climate, abbreviated "Csa" on climate maps.

References

Further reading 
 Patryla, Jim (2005). A Photographic Journey Back to Marineland of the Pacific. Lulu Publishing. .

External links

 Official Palos Verdes Library District
 Palos Verdes Daily Photo blog
 Official South Coast Botanical Garden
 Palos Verdes Peninsula Chamber of Commerce & Visitor's Center

 
Peninsulas of California
Geography of Los Angeles County, California
Landforms of Los Angeles County, California
Los Angeles County, California regions
South Bay, Los Angeles